Mother Goose is a 1944 picture book by Tasha Tudor. Tudor illustrated 76 Mother Goose nursery rhymes. The book was a recipient of a 1945 Caldecott Honor for its illustrations.

References 

1944 children's books
American picture books
Caldecott Honor-winning works
Oxford University Press books